The 2016–17 Florida Atlantic Owls men's basketball team represented Florida Atlantic University during the 2016–17 NCAA Division I men's basketball season. The Owls, led by third-year head coach Michael Curry, played their home games at the FAU Arena in Boca Raton, Florida and were members of Conference USA. They finished the season 10–20, 6–12 in C-USA play to finish in a tie for 11th place. They lost in the first round of the C-USA tournament to Marshall.

Previous season 
The Owls finished the 2015–16 season 8–25, 5–13 in C-USA play to finish in a tie for 12th place. They defeated UTSA in the first round of the C-USA tournament before losing in the second round to Old Dominion.

Offseason

Departures

Incoming transfers

Recruiting class of 2016

Recruiting class of 2017

Preseason 
The Owls were picked to finish in 12th place in the preseason Conference USA poll.

Roster

Schedule and results

|-
!colspan=9 style=| Non-conference regular season

|-
!colspan=12 style=| Conference USA regular season

|-
!colspan=9 style=| Conference USA tournament

References

Florida Atlantic Owls men's basketball seasons
Florida Atlantic
Florida Atlantic Owls men's b
Florida Atlantic Owls men's b